SBC, or low-complexity subband codec, is an audio subband codec specified by the Bluetooth Special Interest Group (SIG) for the Advanced Audio Distribution Profile (A2DP). SBC is a digital audio encoder and decoder used to transfer data to Bluetooth audio output devices like headphones or loudspeakers. It can also be used on the Internet. It was designed with Bluetooth bandwidth limitations and processing power in mind to obtain a reasonably good audio quality at medium bit rates with low computational complexity. As of A2DP version 1.3, the Low Complexity Subband Coding remains the default codec and its implementation is mandatory for devices supporting that profile, but vendors are free to add their own codecs to match their needs.

At CES 2020 the Bluetooth SIG announced LC3 as the successor of SBC. LC3 is used in the LE Audio protocol based on the Bluetooth 5.2 Core Specification.

Design
SBC supports mono and stereo streams, and certain sampling frequencies up to 48 kHz. Maximum bitrate required to be supported by decoders is 320 kbit/s for mono and 512 kbit/s for stereo streams. It uses 4 or 8 subbands, an adaptive bit allocation algorithm in combination with an adaptive block PCM quantizer. Frans de Bont has based the SBC audio codec on his earlier work, and – in parts – on the MPEG-1 Audio Layer II standard. In addition, the SBC is based on the algorithms described in the EP-0400755B1. The patent owners wrote that they allow the free usage of SBC in Bluetooth applications with a goal of boosting the use of this technology.

Variants

Overview

Middle and High Quality
A2DP recommends encoders to support Middle Quality and High Quality presets as specified in the above table. As a result, most operating systems are using the High Quality profile as the default or even the only one supported encoding profile.

Higher quality variants
However, A2DP requires decoders to support higher quality streams, up to 512 kbit/s, and there are some experimental encoders that use this feature: for example, SBC XQ, used by Lineage OS and PipeWire. With higher bit rate, audio quality is comparable to aptX HD (529 kbit/s).

FastStream
While A2DP officially supports only one-way audio streams, CSR has found a way to send a voice-back stream opposite to the main stereo stream, making it possible to use A2DP in headsets with microphones. It was implemented in the FastStream codec, which is the SBC codec with set parameters and the voice-back stream added.

Implementations
The A2DP test specification (V1.0) contains a reference implementation of the encoder and decoder for the SBC codec. A Linux implementation is available at BlueZ - The Linux Bluetooth stack.

See also
Audio codec
aptX
Bluetooth profile
Adaptive differential pulse-code modulation
 List of codecs

References 

Audio codecs
Bluetooth